The Judicature Act was an Act of the New Zealand Parliament passed in 1908, to provide for a system of appellate courts. It received royal assent on 4 August 1908.

The Act was largely repealed as of 1 March 2017 by the Senior Courts Act 2016 and other Acts as part of a Judicature modernisation package. It was repealed as a whole on 1 January 2018 when remaining provisions of the new Acts came into force.

References

External links
Text of the Act

Statutes of New Zealand
1908 in New Zealand law
Repealed New Zealand legislation